Dennis Postlewhite (born 13 October 1957) is an English footballer, who played as a central defender in the Football League for Tranmere Rovers.

References

Tranmere Rovers F.C. players
Chorley F.C. players
Association football central defenders
English Football League players
1957 births
Living people
People from Birkenhead
English footballers